In phonetics, the voiced labiodental flap is a speech sound found primarily in languages of Central Africa, such as Kera and Mangbetu. It has also been reported in the Austronesian language Sika. It is one of the few non-rhotic flaps. The sound begins with the lower lip placed behind the upper teeth. The lower lip is then flipped outward, striking the upper teeth in passing.

Symbol
In 2005, the International Phonetic Association, responding to Kenneth Olson's request for its adoption, voted to include a symbol for this sound, and selected a v with a right hook, that is, a combination of  + . As of version 5.1.0, the Unicode character set encodes this character at U+2C71 (ⱱ). In earlier literature, it is often transcribed by a v modified by the extra-short diacritic, following a 1989 recommendation of the International Phonetic Association. Another historic symbol for this sound was v with curl , which had been employed in articles from the School of Oriental and African Studies, by Joseph Greenberg, and others.

Features
Features of the voiced labiodental flap:

 Its manner of articulation is flap, which normally means it is produced with a single contraction of the muscles so that the tongue makes very brief contact. In this case, being a non-rhotic consonant, the flap is made with the lower lip.
 Its place of articulation is dental, which means it is articulated behind upper front teeth.

Occurrence
The labiodental flap is found primarily in Central Africa, in as many as a few hundred languages found in the Chadic family (Margi, Tera), Ubangian (Ngbaka, Ma'bo, Sera), Mbum (eg Kare), Central Sudanic (Mangbetu, Kresh), and Bantoid (Ngwe, some Shona dialects). It is extremely rare outside Africa, though it has been reported from Sika in Flores.

The bilabial flap is a variant of the labiodental flap in several languages, including Mono. This sound involves striking the upper lip rather than the upper teeth. The two sounds are not known to contrast in any language; the term labial flap can be used as a broader description encompassing both sounds.

In Sika, the flap is heard in careful pronunciation, but it may also be realized as a voiced labiodental stop, or an affricate. It contrasts with both a bilabial and a labiodental fricative:

Notes

References

Further reading

External links
 
 Olson and Hajek, 2001. 'The Geographic and Genetic Distribution of the Labial Flap'
 A Crosslinguistic Lexicon of the Labial Flap (has video & sound files)
 SIL Linguist Successfully Proposes New Phonetic Symbol
 Kenneth S. Olson's research website (has information on the labiodental flap)

Tap and flap consonants
Labiodental consonants
Phonetic transcription symbols
Pulmonic consonants